Andriy Medvedev defeated Yevgeny Kafelnikov in the final, 6–4, 6–4, 3–6, 6–3 to win the singles tennis title at the 1994 Hamburg European Open.

Michael Stich was the defending champion, but was defeated by Kafelnikov in the semifinals.

Seeds
A champion seed is indicated in bold text while text in italics indicates the round in which that seed was eliminated.

  Michael Stich (semifinals)
  Stefan Edberg (second round)
  Goran Ivanišević (second round)
  Andriy Medvedev (champion)
  Magnus Gustafsson (quarterfinals)
  Thomas Muster (third round)
  Boris Becker (second round)
  Petr Korda (third round)
  Carlos Costa (quarterfinals)
  Marc Rosset (first round)
  Richard Krajicek (quarterfinals)
  Alexander Volkov (first round)
  Ivan Lendl (first round)
  Paul Haarhuis (third round)
  Alberto Berasategui (first round)
  Andrei Chesnokov (third round)

Draw

 NB: The Final was the best of 5 sets.

Finals

Top half

Section 1

Section 2

Bottom half

Section 3

Section 4

External links
 1993 ATP German Open draw

Singles